Wesley Darius Donald Charles (born 10 December 1987) is an English former professional footballer who played as a centre-back. He played in the English Football League for Brentford, Stevenage, Burton Albion, AFC Wimbledon and Wycombe Wanderers.

Charles started his career after progressing through the Brentford youth system and he made his first-team debut in 2005. He was loaned out by Brentford on seven occasions and he joined the last of these, Ebbsfleet United, permanently in 2009 in a historic transfer. Six months later, a proposed transfer to York City fell through, after he decided against moving to the city. He spent another season with Ebbsfleet before signing for Stevenage in 2010.

Club career

Brentford
Charles first played football aged 11 while at school, for Greenford Celtic. He later played for Drayton Manor before signing for the Centre of Excellence at Brentford at age 10. He made his first-team debut as a left midfielder in a 2–1 victory over Hull City on 7 May 2005; the final day of the 2004–05 season. He made his first appearance of 2005–06 in the Football League Trophy against Oxford United, which finished as a 1–1 draw after extra time and a 4–3 defeat in a penalty shoot-out, while Charles played as a left-back. His first league appearance of the season came as an 88th minute substitute in a 1–1 draw with Chesterfield on 10 December 2005. He went on to play as a 32nd-minute substitute in a 3–3 draw with Bradford City on 2 January 2006, which proved to be his final appearance of the season for Brentford, which he finished with three appearances. In mid January 2006, he signed a one-year professional contract with a one-year option, effective from June 2006. He was loaned out to Conference South club Thurrock on 3 February 2006, where he made one appearance, in a 1–0 defeat to Weston-super-Mare. He was subsequently sent out to Yeading on 16 March 2006 on a work experience deal, and he made his debut in a 2–1 defeat to Eastbourne Borough, before finishing the loan spell with six appearances.

After having made nine appearances for Brentford during 2006–07, he signed for Staines Town of the Isthmian League Premier Division on 16 October 2006 on a one-month loan. He made two appearances for Staines before returning to Brentford in November 2006. He joined Conference National club Crawley Town on 9 February 2007 on loan until the end of April. He made his debut a day later after coming on as a 72nd-minute substitute in a 2–2 draw with St Albans City. He finished the loan spell with six appearances. He played for Brentford on five further occasions, which included scoring the winning goal in the 89th minute of a 4–3 victory over Port Vale, and he finished the season with 19 Brentford appearances. Brentford took up their option for his contract to be extended for another season in May 2007, before he signed a new two-year contract with the option of another year with the club in June. He signed for Sutton United of the Conference South on 2 August 2007 on an initial three-month loan. He made his debut in a 1–0 defeat to Basingstoke Town. He was recalled by Brentford in September 2007, after making seven appearances for Sutton. He made his first appearance for Brentford of 2007–08 in a 2–0 victory over Chester City on 22 September 2007.

Ebbsfleet United
He joined Conference Premier club Ebbsfleet United on 21 March 2008 on loan until the end of the season, having made 18 appearances for Brentford up to that point in 2007–08. Charles made his Ebbsfleet debut the following day as a 78th-minute substitute in a 3–1 defeat to Stevenage Borough. He started in the following match, a 2–1 victory over Cambridge United, and he finished the loan spell with nine appearances. He made one more appearance for Brentford in 2007–08, in a 1–0 away defeat to Stockport County on 3 May 2008, finishing the season with 19 appearances for the club.

Charles re-signed for Ebbsfleet on 21 June after joining on loan for 2008–09. He fouled Simon Brown to concede a penalty kick against Wrexham on 13 September 2008, which was scored by Brown, as Ebbsfleet lost 3–2. He was sent off for a second bookable offence late into a 1–0 defeat to Histon on 6 October 2008. After his Brentford contract was cancelled he moved to Ebbsfleet permanently on 29 January 2009, after the owners of Ebbsfleet, MyFootballClub, ratified a compensation fee of £25,000, making this the first transfer in football history to be decided by a group of members. He finished the season with 44 appearances and was named Ebbsfleet's Player of the Year.

Conference Premier rivals York City made a £10,000 bid for Charles in June, which was subsequently rejected, with MyFootballClub members voting against the offer with over a 98% majority. Following this, York manager Martin Foyle said it was unlikely they would increase their offer for Charles. Ebbsfleet later agreed to sell Charles and striker Michael Gash for a combined fee of £80,000 to an unnamed club, which was revealed to be York and he was reported to have signed on 29 June 2009. However, the deal eventually fell through after Charles decided against joining the club as he did not want to relocate to York. Shortly after Ebbsfleet received an enquiry about him from an unnamed League Two club, although nothing came of this interest. He later became Ebbsfleet captain and was sent off for dissent in a 1–0 defeat to Tamworth on 21 November 2009. He made 42 appearances for Ebbsfleet during the 2009–10 as they were relegated to the Conference South.

Stevenage
Charles turned down a new contract with Ebbsfleet to sign for newly promoted League Two club Stevenage on a two-year contract for a compensation fee on 18 May 2010. He made his Stevenage debut in the club's 3–1 home victory against Stockport, playing 78 minutes of the match. The following week, he started against Aldershot Town, but was taken off after 38 minutes after struggling with injury. Charles returned to the starting eleven on 18 September 2010, starting in a 0–0 draw against Torquay United, Stevenage's first clean sheet of 2010–11. He scored his first goal for the club in Stevenage's 1–1 draw with Milton Keynes Dons in an FA Cup first round replay in November 2010. Charles' goal came in the fifth minute of stoppage time, taking the match to extra time and then to a penalty shoot-out, which Stevenage won 7–6. Charles received a straight red card for a professional foul on John Johnson in Stevenage's 1–0 home loss to Northampton Town on 11 December 2010, just ten minutes after coming on as a substitute. He scored his second goal for Stevenage in the club's fourth round FA Cup tie against Championship team Reading, cutting inside and curling the ball past the outstretched arm of Adam Federici to restore parity in a match that Stevenage went on to lose 2–1. Charles scored his first league goal of 2010–11 with a shot from 12 yards in Stevenage's 2–1 home win against Bradford City on 2 April 2011. He provided the assist for Joel Byrom's goal after flicking a right-wing cross in Stevenage's 2–0 play-off victory over Accrington Stanley, a match in which he also hit the crossbar with a strike from 30 yards out. Charles started upfront for Stevenage in the 2011 League Two play-off Final, played at Old Trafford on 28 May 2011. Charles' pass through to John Mousinho resulted in the only goal of the match, as a 1–0 victory over Torquay United meant Stevenage were promoted to League One. He played 33 matches for Stevenage during 2010–11, scoring four goals.

After starting in both of Stevenage's opening fixtures of 2011–12, Charles signed a contract extension on 11 August 2011, keeping him contracted to the club until 2013. Two days later, Charles scored his first goal of the season with a close range header in a 1–1 draw away at Chesterfield. Charles' appearances were sporadic throughout the remainder of 2011, with the player suffering from a knee injury. He made his first start in nearly two months in Stevenage's 1–0 away victory against Reading at the Madejski Stadium in the FA Cup on 7 January 2012, with Charles scoring the winning goal in the first-half with a finish from the edge of the area. Charles' season ended prematurely after he suffered a hamstring injury in Stevenage's 1–1 draw with Wycombe Wanderers on 31 March 2012, with the injury ruling him out of action for up to six weeks. He made 34 appearances during the season, scoring five times.

Ahead of 2012–13, Charles signed a new two-year contract with the club. He started in the club's first match of the season, a 3–1 home win over AFC Wimbledon in the League Cup, playing the whole match at left-back. He scored his first goal of the season in a 1–1 draw against Shrewsbury Town on 1 September 2012, after cutting in from the wing to strike into the top corner to restore parity in the match. It turned out to be his only goal of the season as Charles played most of the season at left-back, making 41 appearances during the season. With a year remaining on his current deal, Charles' contract was extended for a further year in June 2013, keeping him contracted to the club until the summer of 2015. He made a goalscoring start to 2013–14, scoring after pouncing on a loose ball in a 4–3 home defeat to Oldham Athletic on the opening day of the season.

Burton Albion
Charles signed for newly promoted League One club Burton Albion on a one-year contract on 19 June 2015. Having failed to appear for Burton, he joined League Two club AFC Wimbledon on 17 March 2016 on loan until the end of 2015–16. Charles started for AFC Wimbledon as they beat Plymouth Argyle 2–0 at Wembley Stadium in the 2016 League Two play-off Final, meaning they were promoted to League One for the first time.

AFC Wimbledon
Charles signed for AFC Wimbledon permanently on 31 May 2016 after a successful loan spell at the club. He scored his first goal for the club in a 2–1 loss to Scunthorpe United on 16 August 2016.

Wycombe Wanderers
Charles signed for newly promoted League One club Wycombe Wanderers on 15 June 2018 on a one-year contract. He was released by Wycombe at the end of the 2018–19 season, before re-signing for the club on 15 August 2019 on a short-term deal until January 2020. He was praised by Wycombe manager Gareth Ainsworth for his attitude upon his return. Charles signed a new one-and-a-half year contract with Wycombe on 10 January 2020. He played in Wycombe's 2–1 win over Oxford in the 2020 League One play-off Final at Wembley, as the club was promoted to the Championship for the first time. He was released by Wycombe at the end of the 2020–21 season.

Return to AFC Wimbledon
Charles re-signed for League One club AFC Wimbledon on 3 July 2021. Initially signed in a player-mentoring role, he was elevated into a first team coaching role in January 2022. On 29 March 2022, following the departure of Mark Robinson, Charles took temporary charge of the club as caretaker manager. Charles returned to his previous roles the following day however following the appointment of Mark Bowen. On 11 April 2022, Charles announced his retirement from football at the age of 34.

International career
Charles was named in the England national C team, who represent England at non-League level, in May 2009, for the final of the 2007–2009 International Challenge Trophy against Belgium. He started the match on 19 May to make his debut as England were beaten 1–0. Charles was called up to the team for a friendly against the Poland Olympic team in November 2009, and started the match as England won 2–1. This was the final of his two caps for England C.

Charles, who is of Grenadian descent, received a call-up to the Grenadian national team in November 2017. He turned it down to focus on club football, but stated he hoped to be called up again in the future. He again turned down a call-up to Grenada in October 2018, stating that he did not want to take any risks having only just recovered from an injury and was still regaining match fitness, although he again stated that would be interested in representing the country at international level in the future.

Style of play
Charles' preferred position is centre-back, although he can also play as a left-back, left midfielder or centre-forward.

Personal life
Charles was born in Ealing, Greater London. His footballing hero when growing up was Ronaldo, and this was because he could "change any game with one bit of genius". He supports Manchester United, and states that the 1999 UEFA Champions League Final between Manchester United and Bayern Munich was the best match he has ever watched. Charles' former partner was pregnant as of July 2009.

Career statistics

Honours
Stevenage
Football League Two play-offs: 2011

AFC Wimbledon
Football League Two play-offs: 2016

Wycombe Wanderers
EFL League One play-offs: 2020

Individual
Ebbsfleet United Player of the Year: 2008–09

References

External links

Profile at the AFC Wimbledon website

1987 births
Living people
Footballers from Ealing
English footballers
England semi-pro international footballers
Association football defenders
Brentford F.C. players
Thurrock F.C. players
Yeading F.C. players
Staines Town F.C. players
Crawley Town F.C. players
Sutton United F.C. players
Ebbsfleet United F.C. players
Stevenage F.C. players
Burton Albion F.C. players
AFC Wimbledon players
Wycombe Wanderers F.C. players
English Football League players
National League (English football) players
Isthmian League players
English sportspeople of Grenadian descent
Black British sportsmen
Association football coaches
Association football player-managers
AFC Wimbledon non-playing staff
AFC Wimbledon managers